Kateřina Němcová (born November 14, 1990) is a Czech and American chess player holding the title of Woman Grandmaster (WGM). She was women's Czech champion in 2008 and 2010. She came second in the World Youth Chess Championship of 2007 and won the European Youth Chess Championship of 2008.

Němcová transferred national federations from Czech Republic to the United States in 2013. She competed in the Women's World Chess Championship in 2017.

Němcová attends Webster University, where she is a member of Susan Polgar's and Paul Truong's SPICE (Susan Polgar Institute for Chess Excellence) Program.

References

External links

 
 
 
 
 

1990 births
Living people
American female chess players
Czech female chess players
Chess woman grandmasters
Chess Olympiad competitors
Sportspeople from Prague
Czech emigrants to the United States
21st-century American women